is a former Japanese football player.

Playing career
Furukawa was born in Miyaki, Saga on October 28, 1981. He joined J2 League club Sagan Tosu based in his local from youth team in 2000. Although he played as midfielder from first season, he could not become a regular player. He played many matches in 2002. However his opportunity to play decreased in 2003 and he could not play at all in the match in 2004. He retired end of 2004 season.

Club statistics

References

External links

1981 births
Living people
Association football people from Saga Prefecture
Japanese footballers
J2 League players
Sagan Tosu players
Association football midfielders